Salap is a census town in Domjur CD Block of Howrah Sadar subdivision in Howrah district in the Indian state of West Bengal. It is a part of Kolkata Urban Agglomeration.

Geography

Demographics
As per 2011 Census of India Salap had a total population of 15,171 of which 7,826 (52%) were males and 7,345 (48%) were females. Population below 6 years was 1,413. The total number of literates in Salap was 11,830 (85.99% of the population over 6 years).

Salap was part of Kolkata Urban Agglomeration in 2011 census.

 India census, Salap had a population of 11,759. Males constitute 52% of the population and females 48%. Salap has an average literacy rate of 75%, higher than the national average of 59.5%: male literacy is 80% and female literacy is 69%. In Salap, 11% of the population is under 6 years of age.

Transport

Salap is the junction of National Highway 16 (part of Asian Highway 45) also called Mumbai Road and Makardaha Road (part of State Highway 15). People can easily go to several areas of Kolkata, Howrah and Hooghly from here.

Bus

Private Bus
 63 Domjur - Howrah Station
 79 Panchla - Dunlop
 E43 Dihibhursut - Howrah Station
 E44 Rampur - Howrah Station
 E53 Narit - Howrah Station
 K11 Domjur - Rabindra Sadan
 L3 Jhikhira/Muchighata - Howrah Station
 31(mini)- Makardaha - Khidirpur

WBTC Express Bus
 E77- Sukanta Park-Dharmatala

NDRTC
 Rashbehari Avenue- Dhulagarh
 Dhulagarh-Chingrighata
 Shyambazar- Bagnan

Without Bus Number
 Salap - Nagerbazar
 Salap - Barrackpore

Many Shuttle Buses (Without Numbers) also pass through Salap.

Train
Dansi railway station is the nearest railway station on Howrah-Amta line.

Bank
In Salap town there is Govt Bank such as Paschim Banga Gramin Bank as well as Private Bank such as Bandhan Bank exists. There is also several ATMs exists such as IndusInd Bank and Punjab National Bank.

Infrastructure 
Kolkata West International City is a proposed satellite township development at Salap in Howrah district in the form of a joint-venture between two Indonesian conglomerates - Salim Group, Ciputra Development - and Singapore -based Universal Success Group. 

Realty major Shapoorji Pallonji Real Estate has announced the launch of a new phase at Joyville Howrah near Salap, West Bengal. The new phase will have around 240 units of 2 BHK and 3 BHK configuration, ranging from 621 sq. ft. to 831 sq.

References

Cities and towns in Howrah district
Neighbourhoods in Kolkata
Kolkata Metropolitan Area